Bailey Gatzert (December 29, 1829 – April 19, 1893) was an American politician and the eighth mayor of Seattle, Washington, serving from 1875 to 1876. He was the first Jewish mayor of Seattle, narrowly missing being the first Jewish mayor of a major American city (Moses Bloom became mayor of Iowa City, Iowa, in 1873). , he has been the only Jewish mayor of Seattle.

Gatzert was born in 1829 in Darmstadt, Germany, and emigrated to Natchez, Mississippi, in 1849, coming west four years later. In 1869 he opened a Seattle branch of Schwabacher Brothers and Company, a hardware and general store he managed as partners with his brothers-in-law Abraham, Louis, and Sigmund Schwabacher.

In addition to being mayor, Gatzert was charter member of the Seattle Chamber of Commerce, served on the Seattle City Council 1872–1873 and 1877–1878  and was president of Puget Sound National Bank and Peoples Savings Bank. He co-founded Washington's second synagogue (Seattle's first), Ohaveth Shalom, which opened in 1892. Washington's first synagogue was built in Spokane.

The famous sternwheeler Bailey Gatzert is named for him, as is an elementary school in Seattle.

See also
Utilities of Seattle: Getzert's partnership in the Spring Hill Water Company

References

1893 deaths
Seattle City Council members
Mayors of Seattle
American bankers
Politicians from Darmstadt
German emigrants to the United States
Jewish American people in Washington (state) politics
Jewish mayors of places in the United States
19th-century German Jews
1829 births
19th-century American politicians
19th-century American businesspeople